This is a list of Pittsburg State Gorillas football season records. The Pittsburg State Gorillas football team is the football team of Pittsburg State University, located in the American city of Pittsburg, Kansas. The team competes as a Mid-America Intercollegiate Athletics Association (MIAA) at the NCAA Division II level.

In the program's beginning, the team was known as the Normals, but that changed in the early 1920s when the student body voted to be nicknamed the Gorillas. Since 1924, Pittsburg State's football team has played in Carnie Smith Stadium, named after the seventh head coach at Pittsburg State. Prior to renaming the stadium after Smith in 1986, the stadium was named after the school's first president, William Aaron Brandenburg. However, the field is named Brandenburg Field.

Pittsburg State has won 31 conference championships: two in the Kansas Intercollegiate Athletic Conference, nine in the Central Intercollegiate Athletic Conference, one in the Rocky Mountain Athletic Conference, seven in the Central States Intercollegiate Conference, and 12 in the Missouri/Mid-America Intercollegiate Athletics Association.

Seasons
, the records are up-to-date.

|-
|colspan="8" style="text-align:center; "|

|-
|colspan="8" style="text-align:center; "|

|-
|colspan="8" style="text-align:center; "|

|-
|colspan="8" style="text-align:center; "|

|-
|colspan="8" style="text-align:center; "|

References

Pittsburg State Gorillas

Pittsburg State Gorillas football seasons